Tait Mackrill (born 3 September 1999) is an Australian rules footballer who played for  (GWS) in the AFL Women's (AFLW). She was drafted in the 2017 AFLW rookie draft before debuting in round 3 of the 2019 season.

Early life 
From Port Broughton, South Australia, Mackrill has a footballing background; her father played more than 200 matches for his local team. She originally played for the Broughton-Mundoora Football Club. After a move to Adelaide, she began playing for Morphettville Park and later represented Adelaide University.

She began studying psychology at university during her football career, majoring in criminology.

AFLW career 
Mackrill was drafted by GWS with pick 9 in the 2017 AFLW rookie draft, their second selection. She did not play a match in her first season. Over the off-season, Mackrill played in Essendon's inaugural VFL Women's side. She made her AFLW debut in round 3 of the 2019 season against , which was the subject of a 7:30 television interview.

Mackrill was delisted at the conclusion of the 2019 season. She was later redrafted by GWS with pick #95. In the sixth round of the 2020 season, Mackrill was nominated for the 2020 AFL Women's Rising Star award.

References

External links 

Living people
1999 births
Australian rules footballers from South Australia
Greater Western Sydney Giants (AFLW) players